Hurricane in Galveston is a 1913 American short documentary directed by King Vidor. It was Vidor's debut film as a director.

Production
King Vidor and Ray Clough produced and photographed the film using a homemade camera borrowed from a friend. The commercial release was limited to the state of Texas.  Hurricane in Galveston is a lost film.

Footnotes

References
Durgnat, Raymond and Simmon, Scott. 1988. King Vidor, American. University of California Press, Berkeley.

External links

1913 films
1913 short films
1913 directorial debut films
1913 drama films
1913 lost films
Silent American drama films
American silent short films
American black-and-white films
Films directed by King Vidor
Films set in 1900
Films set in Texas
Galveston Hurricane of 1900
Lost drama films
Lost American films
1910s American films